Anthony J. Bryant (February 14, 1961 – December 25, 2013) was an American author and editor.

Biography
Bryant was born in Franklin, Indiana, and was adopted at age 5 by Robert M. and Margaret Bryant.

After Robert M. Bryant's death in 1967, Tony and his mother moved to Miami Shores, Florida, where he spent his youth and attended Pinecrest Preparatory School. After graduating from Florida State University in 1983 with a bachelor's degree in Japanese studies, he completed his graduate studies in Japanese studies (history, language, and armor) at Takushoku University in Tokyo, graduating in 1986.  Bryant lived in Japan from 1986 to 1992.  He also earned an M.A. in Japanese from Indiana University Bloomington in 2003.

An authority on the making of Japanese armor, he joined the Nihon Katchū Bugu Kenkyū Hozon Kai ("Japan Association for Arms and Armor Preservation"), and was one of four non-Asian members.  While living in Japan, he also worked as a features editor for the Mainichi Daily News, and as editor for the Tokyo Journal, an English language monthly magazine.

Bryant wrote four books for Osprey Publishing on samurai history, and co-authored, with Mark T. Arsenault, the core rulebook for the role-playing game Sengoku: Chanbara Roleplaying in Feudal Japan.  He was a historian of Japan specializing in Kamakura, Muromachi, and Momoyama period warrior culture. His areas of interest also included Heian-period court structure and society and Japanese literature.

After returning from Japan, in 1995 he became the editor of Dragon Magazine, the flagship publication of TSR, Inc., the creators of the role-playing game Dungeons & Dragons.  He was the editor for eight issues, before Dave Gross took over.

Bryant died on December 25, 2013, at St. Francis Health in Indianapolis.

Books
 The Samurai, (Elite), Osprey Publishing, London (1989)  
 Early Samurai AD 200–1500, Osprey Publishing, London (1991)  
 Samurai 1550–1600, Osprey Publishing, London (1994)  
 Sekigahara 1600: The Final Struggle for Power, Osprey Publishing, London (1995)  
 Sengoku: Chanbara Roleplaying in Feudal Japan, Gold Rush Games; Revised edition (May 1, 2002)
 Iwaya no sōshi ("The Tale of the Cave House"): A Translation and Commentary, Indiana University (2003)
 Sekigahara 1600: The Final Struggle for Power, Praeger Publishers (September 2005)

Other works
 Nihon Katchu Seisakuben, a Japanese armor manual
 The Estates of Heian Nobility (essay)

References

External links
 Sengoku Daimyo – Anthony J. Bryant's website
 Author of Osprey books on Japanese military history Article on Rencentral.com
 Author biography from Osprey Military Publishing

1961 births
20th-century American historians
20th-century American male writers
2013 deaths
21st-century American historians
21st-century American male writers
American adoptees
American male non-fiction writers
American military historians
Dungeons & Dragons game designers
Florida State University alumni
Historians of Japan
Indiana University Bloomington alumni
People from Franklin, Indiana
Writers from Indiana